XEZZ-AM is a radio station on 760 AM in Huentitán el Bajo, Jalisco. It is owned by Radiópolis and known as Radio Gallito.  760 AM is a United States clear-channel frequency.

History
XEZZ received its concession on January 15, 1953 as XEHJ-AM. The 5,000-watt daytimer was owned by María Cruz de la Torre and located in Tonalá, where it moved after a brief stint in Zapotlanejo. Melodia 76, S.A., became the concessionaire in 1966, and XEZZ, S.A. de C.V. took over that position in 1982, the same year the station became known as Radio Gallito.

External links
Radio Gallito Facebook

References

Radio stations in Guadalajara
Radiópolis